According to Tacitus, Calgacus (sometimes Calgacos or Galgacus) was a chieftain of the Caledonian Confederacy who fought the Roman army of Gnaeus Julius Agricola at the Battle of Mons Graupius in northern Scotland in AD 83 or 84. His name can be interpreted as Celtic *calg-ac-os, "possessing a blade", and is seemingly related to the Gaelic calgach (meaning prickly or fierce). Whether the word is a name or a given title is unknown.

Biography
He was the first Caledonian to be recorded in history. The only historical source that features him is Tacitus' Agricola, which describes him as "the most distinguished for birth and valour among the chieftains". Tacitus wrote a speech which he attributed to Calgacus, saying that Calgacus gave it in advance of the Battle of Mons Graupius. The speech describes the exploitation of Britain by Rome and rouses his troops to fight.

The following excerpt is from the speech attributed to Calgacus by the historian Tacitus in the Agricola, but most historians note that since Calgacus was fighting Tacitus' father-in-law (Gnaeus Julius Agricola) in this battle the reader should assume bias:

Calgacus is not mentioned during or after the battle and he is not named as one of the hostages Agricola took with him after putting the Caledonians to flight. Both Calgacus and the speech may be figments of Tacitus's invention.

His speech is often quoted as "they make a desert and call it peace".

References

External links

Calgacus's Full Speech to his Troops (A.D. 85)

Pictish people
Celtic rulers
Celtic warriors
Scotland in the Roman era
1st-century monarchs in Europe
Year of birth unknown
Place of birth unknown
Year of death unknown